Shirley Geraldine Ratcliffe (September 1932 – 17 July 2013) was a British doctor and researcher into sex chromosome disorders.

Early life and education
Shirley Geraldine Elphinstone-Roe was born in Kenya in September 1932.  Her parents moved the family to England when she was five, and she was orphaned five years later when both her parents died in the Second World War. She was adopted along with her sister by an aunt in Edenbridge, Kent. When she was 16, she nursed her aunt while her aunt died of cancer.

She studied at the Royal College of Physicians of London, receiving her license to practice in 1956 under the name Shirley Ratcliffe, as she had married.

Career
Shortly after graduation she moved to Edinburgh to join her husband, who was in art school there at the time.

Starting as a specialist trainee paediatrician at Edinburgh's Royal Hospital for Sick Children, she joined the UK's Medical Research Council in 1971 as a clinical scientist and honorary consultant paediatrician.  In 1967 the MRC in Edinburgh launched a longitudinal study of infants, in order to determine the prevalence of sex chromosome disorders and to track outcomes of people born with them; the study was launched due to sensational publications claiming that XYY males were doomed to become aggressive and criminal adults.  Ratcliffe was part of the study from the beginning and continued with it until it ended in the mid-1990s; it became the focus of her career. In 1987, she moved to Great Ormond Street Hospital's Institute of Child Health due to the expertise of its staff in growth analysis. A summary of the study's findings published in 1999. Her work provided the foundation of contemporary medical understanding of abnormal chromosomes.

Personal life
Ratcliffe and her husband had two children; she and her husband divorced in 1974. She was active in the Medical Campaign Against Nuclear Weapons movement in the 1980s.

She was diagnosed with Parkinson's disease in 2000, and came out of retirement to serve as a director of the Parkinson's Disease Society Of the United Kingdom from 2005 to 2009. She died 17 July 2013.

Selected works

References 

1932 births
2013 deaths
British women medical doctors
20th-century British women writers
British medical writers
20th-century Kenyan women